The Poaphilini are a tribe of moths in the family Erebidae.

Taxonomy
Phylogenetic studies have shown that the tribe is most closely related to the tribe Ophiusini. Those studies indicate that the genera Achaea, Mimophisma, and Ophisma belong in the Poaphilini despite formerly being classified in the Ophiusini.

Genera

Achaea
Allotria
Argyrostrotis
Bastilla
Chalciope
Cutina
Focillidia
Gondysia
Mimophisma
Ophisma
Parallelia

References

 
Erebinae
Moth tribes